Marciano Carlos Alberto Vink (born 17 October 1970) is a Dutch former professional footballer. Throughout his career he played primarily as a right defensive midfielder and as a right central defender. He most notably played for Ajax and PSV in the Eredivisie and Genoa in the Serie A. Injury prone since the very beginning of his career, he was forced to quit prematurely at the age of 28.

Club career

Early years
Born a few months after the 1970 FIFA World Cup into a football crazy family in Paramaribo, Suriname, Vink thanks his middle names to the feats of the Brazil national football team that year, as he was named after its captain Carlos Alberto Torres. The Vink family moved to the Netherlands, and it was there that young Marciano learned his trade at TOS Actief and ADE in Amsterdam. A prolific young player, Vink's talents were soon noticed by the Ajax scouts and it wasn't before long he was admitted to play for one of the greatest sides in European football history.

Career with Ajax
He swiftly rose through ranks of Ajax's youth Academy with a number of extremely talented players such as: Dennis Bergkamp, Frank de Boer, Ronald de Boer, Clarence Seedorf, Ronald Koeman and Marco van Basten. Vink was deemed to be a huge prospect and was heralded to become the next Frank Rijkaard. His rise through the youth ranks and his debut at the age of 18 in 1988 were, however, no indication of how his career would ultimately unfold. He would play 108 matches in his five-year stint with Ajax until coach Louis van Gaal decided to dismantle the team that won the UEFA Cup in 1992 to make way for a younger generation of players such as Patrick Kluivert, Clarence Seedorf, Michael Reiziger and Edgar Davids. In 1993 Vink therefore opted for Italian side Genoa.

Career continued
Vink's spell with Genoa turned out to be a disappointment. He played only 13 matches (2 goals), in a season which saw Genoa narrowly avoid relegation to Serie B. He quickly decided to move back to the Netherlands with top side PSV Eindhoven. Although PSV Eindhoven was progressively starting to challenge Ajax for the domination of the Eredivisie, Vink did not play the part his coaches might have had in mind for him as he was often sidelined through injury. In 1997 his injury plagued stay with PSV came to a grinding halt as Luís Figo made an uncompromising tackle in the Champions League match FC Barcelona - PSV. He spent the next two seasons rehabilitating, but to no avail. In 1999 his contract expired and he was not extended. He played only 48 matches in 5 seasons and was left with a damaged reputation. He decided to join 1st division outfit ADO Den Haag on amateur basis in order to revitalize his career, but only played 5 competition matches. After this, one could not help but think that the career of Marciano Vink was over. However, Vink showed his resilience by returning to professional football briefly, in order to show the critics that he had just been unlucky in his career and that he was indeed a quality player. He played for one more season with the Ajax satellite club Ajax Cape Town. The 1992 UEFA Cup winner turned out to be a more than welcome addition to the squad. In 2002, he permanently retired from professional football and became a player agent.

International career
Marciano Vink has capped twice for the Netherlands in 1991, at the height of his career. At the age of 20 he was called up by national team coach Rinus Michels for the European Championship qualifier matches for Sweden 1992 against Malta and Finland. He earned two caps in one month, but was never called up again, mostly due to injury.

Career statistics

Honours
Ajax
 Eredivisie: 1989–90
 KNVB Cup: 1992–93
 Dutch Super Cup: 1993
 UEFA Cup: 1991–92

PSV
 Eredivisie: 1996–97
 KNVB Cup: 1995–96
 Johan Cruyff Shield: 1997, 1998

References

External links

1970 births
Living people
Sportspeople from Paramaribo
Surinamese emigrants to the Netherlands
Dutch footballers
Dutch expatriate footballers
Netherlands international footballers
Association football midfielders
AFC Ajax players
Genoa C.F.C. players
Eredivisie players
Eerste Divisie players
Serie A players
South African Premier Division players
Expatriate footballers in Italy
PSV Eindhoven players
ADO Den Haag players
Cape Town Spurs F.C. players
Expatriate soccer players in South Africa
Dutch expatriate sportspeople in Italy
Dutch expatriate sportspeople in South Africa
UEFA Cup winning players